The 1952–53 Swedish Division I season was the ninth season of Swedish Division I ice hockey. Sodertalje SK defeated Hammarby IF in the league final, 1 game to none, 1 tie.

Regular season

Northern Group

Southern Group

Final
 Hammarby IF – Södertälje SK 2–2, 1–5

External links
 1952–53 season

Swedish Division I seasons
1952–53 in Swedish ice hockey
Swedish